History of song (or History of Song) may refer to:

History of Song, one of the Twenty-Four Histories of China
History of the Song dynasty
History of Song, a state during the Zhou dynasty
History of the Chinese surname, Song
History of Song District, in Sarawak, Malaysia
History of Song, an airline brand owned and operated by Delta Air Lines

See also
History of music